The Markup Validation Service is a validator by the World Wide Web Consortium (W3C) that allows Internet users to check pre-HTML5 HTML and XHTML documents for well-formed markup against a document type definition. Markup validation is an important step towards ensuring the technical quality of web pages. However, it is not a complete measure of web standards conformance.  Though W3C validation is important for browser compatibility and site usability, it has not been confirmed what effect it has on search engine optimization.

As HTML5 has removed the use of DTD in favor of a "Living Standard", the traditional Markup Validation Service is not applicable to these formats. Validation is instead performed using an open-source "Nu Validator", an instance of which is provided by W3C.

History
The Markup Validation Service began as The Kinder, Gentler HTML Validator, a project by Gerald Oskoboiny. It was developed to be a more intuitive version of the first online HTML validator written by Dan Connolly and Mark Gaither, which was announced on July 13, 1994.

In September 1997, Oskoboiny began working for the W3C, and on December 18, 1997, the W3C announced its W3C HTML Validator based upon his works. In November 2008, the W3C released the validator.nu HTML5 engine and the ability to check documents for conformance to HTML5.

W3C also offers validation tools for web technologies other than HTML/XHTML, such as CSS, XML schemas, and MathML.

Browser accommodation
Many major web browsers are often tolerant of certain types of error, and may display a document successfully even if it is not syntactically correct. Certain other XML documents can also be validated if they refer to an internal or external DTD.

Limitations
Mark-up validators cannot see the "big picture" on a web page, but they excel at picking up missed closing tags and other technicalities.

DTD-based validators are also limited in their ability to check attribute values according to many specification documents. For example, using an HTML 4.01 DOCTYPE, bgcolor="fffff" is accepted as valid for the "body" element even though the value "fffff" is missing a preceding '#' character and contains only five (instead of six) hexadecimal digits. Also, for the "img" element, width="really wide" is also accepted as valid. DTD-based validators are technically not able to test for these types of attribute value problems.

Pages may not display as intended in all browsers, even in the absence of validation errors and successful display in other browsers. The only way to ensure that pages always display as intended is to test them in all browsers expected to render them correctly.

CSS validation
While the W3C and other HTML and XHTML validators will assess pages coded in those formats, a separate validator like the W3C CSS validator can check that there are no errors in the associated Cascading Style Sheet. CSS validators apply current CSS standards to referenced CSS documents.

See also
 HTML Tidy, an offline markup validation program developed by Dave Raggett of W3C
 CSE HTML Validator, an offline HTML and CSS validator
 World Wide Web Consortium (W3C)

References

External links

The W3C Markup Validation Service
The W3C CSS Validation Service
The W3C Monitoring Service

Web design
World Wide Web Consortium